Edward Chang may refer to:
 Edward Chang (electrical engineer)
 Edward Chang (neurosurgeon)